PISat (PESIT Imaging Satellite) is a remote sensing nanosatellite developed by the PES University, Bengaluru.

The satellite weighs 5 kg and carries an image camera that can capture pictures with 80 meter resolution. Muie

Mission 

The main mission of the satellite was to develop the capability of designing satellites on campus with collaboration from students and professors.

Launch 

The satellite was launched on 26 September 2016 by ISRO using the PSLV-C35 rocket.

References

External links 
 
 PISat on Indian Space Research Organisation

Mini satellites of India
Student satellites